Etheostoma gore (Cumberland darter) is a freshwater fish found in Kentucky and Tennessee in the Cumberland River drainage below Cumberland Falls. It was named after the 45th vice-president of the United States, Al Gore, for his environmental vision, commitment, and accomplishments throughout decades of public service and his role in educating the public and raising awareness on the issue of global climate change.

See also
 List of organisms named after famous people (born 1900–1949)

References

Freshwater fish of the United States
gore
Taxa named by Steven R. Layman
Taxa named by Richard L. Mayden
Fish described in 2012